Lake Ibsen is a small lake near Leeds in Benson County, North Dakota. The stream Little Coulee flows from Hurricane Lake, through Lake Ibsen, to Silver Lake. Lake Ibsen got its name from Norwegian settlers.

References

Ibsen
Bodies of water of Benson County, North Dakota